Instant Karma is an independent record label created by former Warner Music Group chairman and head of the BPI, Rob Dickins, in 1999.
The label was founded by Dickins after his resignation from Warner Music, where he gained fame for his track record of signing female vocalists such as Enya and the Corrs. Instant Karma's first release was Helicopter Girl's How to Steal the World album in June 2000; the label received attention for the fact that its very first release was short-listed for the Mercury Prize. Helicopter Girl signed with Instant Karma on the condition that she be permitted not to tour.

Dickins noted that he was pleased to have How to Steal the World as the label's "calling card", but that he planned other releases to have more immediate commercial appeal.

The label was funded by Sony Music UK. British DJ/producer K-Gee's first solo single and album were released on Instant Karma in October 2000 and October 2002, respectively.

Acts
 Addis Black Widow
 The Alice Band
 Bleached Bones
 Blossomer
 Derek Jarman
 Donna McKevitt
 Eberg
 Fuzz Light Years
 Ghostland
 Helicopter Girl
 I Monster
 Jaed
 Jonatha Brooke
 K-Gee
 The Kennedy Soundtrack
 Lorien
 Louie Austen
 Panjabi MC
 The Past Present Organisation
 WigWam

See also
 List of record labels

External links
Official website

References

Instant Karma
Instant Karma
Pop record labels
Electronic music record labels
IFPI members